Bayt Peak is a conspicuous peak,  high, overlooking the south shore of Briand Fjord in Flandres Bay, on the west coast of Graham Land. The southeast entrance point of Briand Fjord was charted by the French Antarctic Expedition under Jean-Baptiste Charcot, 1903–05, and named "Pointe Bayet" for Charles Bayet, Director of Instruction and member of the Commission of Scientific Work of the expedition. As air photos show no well-defined headland in this position the name has been applied to this conspicuous peak.

References
 

Mountains of Graham Land
Danco Coast